Mushkin is an American computer hardware company best known for producing computer memory modules (RAM). Located in Pflugerville, Texas, its customers include gamers and industry professionals. It has supplied to companies like Apple Inc. and NASA.

Mushkin products include solid-state drives SSD, computer power supply units (PSUs), and RAM modules for desktops, servers, and laptops. They also produce a line of USB flash drives. Their memory products are available in several performance categories, from standard to extreme. One of their notable RAM products is the “REDLINE” series, intended for overclockers.

Corporate information

History
1994-2000

Mushkin, Inc. was founded in Denver, Colorado, in 1994 by William Michael Mushkin. William Mushkin was one of the first people to start testing chip speeds to build a memory module that would run faster than the manufactured-specified speed, also known as overclocking. The purpose of this was to boost performance and attracted the most demanding users, such as gamers.

As Mushkin, Inc. began to grow, it quickly attracted Ramtron International Corporation and its subsidiary, Enhanced Memory Systems and on May 11, 2000, they announced an agreement to acquire Mushkin, Inc. through a merge. By June 15, 2000, Ramtron and Enhanced Memory Systems announced the completion of the merge, and Mushkin had become a wholly owned subsidiary of Ramtron.

2001–present

In July 2005, George Stathakis, the general manager, purchased Mushkin from Ramtron and became Mushkin's new owner and president.

To accommodate growth, the company needed more space and a building more suitable for light manufacturing, assembly, R&D, and component testing therefore in December 2008, Mushkin moved its headquarters from Denver, Colorado, to Inverness, a suburban tech center in Englewood, Colorado. The new building had 50% more production space, 30% more room for testing and R&D, and 40% more office space.

In 2013, Mushkin was acquired by Avant Technology, the largest manufacturer of RAM and storage products in North America and is currently headquartered in Pflugerville, Texas, just outside of Austin, Texas. For more than 30 years, Avant Technology has provided modular products to the memory industry. Avant is focused on providing memory products and client services from development of advanced DRAM and flash sub-assemblies to supply and support of the most popular legacy modules. Engineering and sales for all brands are based at the corporate headquarters near Austin, Texas. U.S. Technology is located in Miami, Florida, and serves as a distributor of computer products to Latin America, and Avant de Mexico is their manufacturing facility in Matamoros, Mexico.

References

External links
 

Companies based in Austin, Texas
American companies established in 1994
Computer memory companies
Computer power supply unit manufacturers